The 2022–23 Bahraini Second Division, is an edition of the second and lowest level football league in Bahrain. The season started on 8 September 2022.

Team location

League table

Results

Positions by round
The table lists the positions of teams after each week of matches.

Notes

References

Bahraini Second Division seasons
Second Division
Bahrain